The women's shot put at the 1962 European Athletics Championships was held in Belgrade, then Yugoslavia, at JNA Stadium on 12 September 1962.

Medalists

Results

Final
12 September

Participation
According to an unofficial count, 12 athletes from 7 countries participated in the event.

 (2)
 (3)
 (1)
 (1)
 (1)
 (2)
 (2)

References

Shot put
Shot put at the European Athletics Championships
Euro